Thomas Emmet may refer to:

Thomas Addis Emmet (1764–1827), Irish and American lawyer and politician
Thomas Addis Emmet (bishop) (1873–1950), American-born bishop of the Catholic Church
Thomas A. Emmet, one of the founders of the American Society of Civil Engineers
Tom Emmett (1841–1904), English cricketer